Another Way is a South Korean indie romantic drama film directed by Cho Chang-ho which premiered in 2015 at the 20th Busan International Film Festival, and was released to theatres in South Korea in January 2017.

Plot
Soo-wan (Kim Jae-wook) and Jung-won (Seo Yea-ji) come from unstable families and have their own problems. After they meet on an online internet cafe, both of them decide to do a suicide pact.

Cast 
 Kim Jae-wook as Soo-wan
 Seo Yea-ji as Jung-won
 Kang Soo-jin as Hye-mi
 Jo Young-jin as Soo-wan's father
 Kang Ae-sim as Jung-won's mother
 Kim Se-dong as Jung-won's father

References

External links 
 

2015 romantic drama films
Films about suicide
South Korean romantic drama films
2010s Korean-language films
2010s South Korean films